Marija Žižić (born 2 July 1995) is a Montenegrin footballer who plays as a goalkeeper. She has been a member of the Montenegro women's national team.

References

1995 births
Living people
Women's association football goalkeepers
Montenegrin women's footballers
Montenegro women's international footballers
ŽFK Ekonomist players